The Venturi Astrolab was an early-2000s concept battery electric car with adjunct energy provided from solar panels mounted to the vehicle.  It was unveiled at the Mondial de l’Automobile in 2006.

Technical specifications
The original Venturi Astrolab uses a  electric motor in place of the internal combustion engine fitted to most cars. The top speed of the Venturi Astrolab .

References

 Car Body Design Review

External links

 Official website
 Official website (April 2018)

Electric concept cars
2000s cars
Rear mid-engine, rear-wheel-drive vehicles
Venturi vehicles
Vehicles introduced in 2006